Lepidozia ulothrix is a species of liverwort in the family Lepidoziaceae. The habitat is moist areas in Australia and New Zealand.

References

Lepidoziaceae
Flora of Australia
Flora of New Zealand
Plants described in 1845